The Pakistan National Basketball Team is the basketball team representing Pakistan in international competitions, organised and run by the Pakistan Basketball Federation.

Its biggest success came at the Asian Championship in 1979 where Team Pakistan surprisingly finished 6th, ahead of teams such as Team Iran, which did not qualify for the event and Team Malaysia. In the last decades, Pakistan has been a force at the regional stage as the team won the silver medal at the 2013 SABA Championship and three silver medals at the South Asian Games.

Roster
Team for the 2013 SABA Championship:

Competitions

Summer Olympics
yet to qualify

World championships
yet to qualify

FIBA Asia Cup

South Asian Games
1995 : 
1999 : 
2004 : 
2010 : ?
2016 : win 2 matches exhibition matches

SABA Championship
2002 : Did Not Participate
2013 : 
2014 : Did Not Participate
2015 : Did Not Participate

Head coach position
M. Amin Butt - 1984
Javed Shah 
M. Riaz Malik - 1997
Abdul Ghafoor – 2010
Agha Arshed Ali – 2016
M. Riaz Malik – 2017

Past rosters
Team for the 2017 Islamic Solidarity Games Baku:

See also
Pakistan Basketball Federation
Pakistan national under-19 basketball team

References

External links
Pakistan Basketball Federation PBBF
Pakistan Basketball Records at FIBA Archive
Presentation on Facebook

Men's national basketball teams
Basketball
1958 establishments in Pakistan
Basketball in Pakistan
Basketball teams in Pakistan